The 1986 Tour de France was the 73rd edition of Tour de France, one of cycling's Grand Tours. The Tour began in Boulogne-Billancourt with a prologue individual time trial on 4 July and Stage 11 occurred on 14 July with a flat stage to Bordeaux. The race finished on the Champs-Élysées in Paris on 27 July.

Prologue
4 July 1986 — Boulogne-Billancourt,  (individual time trial)

Stage 1
5 July 1986 — Nanterre to Sceaux,

Stage 2
5 July 1986 — Meudon to Saint-Quentin-en-Yvelines,  (team time trial)

Stage 3
6 July 1986 — Levallois-Perret to Liévin,

Stage 4
7 July 1986 — Liévin to Évreux,

Stage 5
8 July 1986 — Évreux to Villers-sur-Mer,

Stage 6
9 July 1986 — Villers-sur-Mer to Cherbourg,

Stage 7
10 July 1986 — Cherbourg to Saint-Hilaire-du-Harcouët,

Stage 8
11 July 1986 — Saint-Hilaire-du-Harcouët to Nantes,

Stage 9
12 July 1986 — Nantes to Nantes,  (individual time trial)

Stage 10
13 July 1986 — Nantes to Futuroscope,

Stage 11
14 July 1986 — Poitiers to Bordeaux,

References

1986 Tour de France
Tour de France stages